The Vauziron is a stream that flows through Châteldon in Puy-de-Dôme, France. It is a right tributary of the river Dore.

References

Rivers of Puy-de-Dôme
Rivers of France
Rivers of Auvergne-Rhône-Alpes